Mar Shimun XVI Yohannan (also Shemon XVI Yohannan) was Patriarch of the Shem'on line (Qodshanis) of the Church of the East, from 1780. In 1804, he became the sole Patriarch among traditionalist Christians of the East Syriac Rite, because the rival Patriarch Eliya XII (1778-1804) of the Eliya line died without successor. Shimun XVI remained patriarch until his death in 1820.

Biography

Until 1804, there were two rival patriarchal lines among traditionalist Christians of the Church of the East, senior Eliya line in Alqosh and junior Shemon line in Qochanis. The last patriarch of the senior line, Eliya XII, died in 1804 and was buried in the ancient Rabban Hormizd Monastery. His branch decided not to elect a new patriarch, thus ending that line, and eventually enabling the remaining patriarch Shimun XVI of the junior line to become the sole primate of the entire traditionalist community (modern Assyrian Church of the East).

See also
 Patriarch of the Church of the East
 List of patriarchs of the Church of the East
 List of patriarchs of the Assyrian Church of the East
 Assyrian Church of the East

References

Sources

External links 
 Mar Shimun Patriarchal Timeline
 Official site of the Assyrian Church of the East

1820 deaths
18th-century bishops of the Church of the East
Assyrians from the Ottoman Empire
Year of birth missing
Patriarchs of the Church of the East